Solon McDade (born March 1974 in Edmonton, Alberta) is a Canadian musician and composer.

Career
He began playing the cello at age four. By the time he was nine, he was playing double bass, washtub bass, and violin in the McDade Family Band. In his teens he performed at various Canadian folk festivals, the Commonwealth Games, and for the British royal family. He attended MacEwan University and studied jazz at McGill University where he received his Master's Degree in 2017. While a student, he toured with Bill Bourne, Maria Dunn, and his sister Shannon Johnson. He has received nominations by the Juno Awards and Aria Awards. He has worked with Luther Johnson, Billy Boy Arnold, Wildchild Butler, Michael Coleman, Susie Arioli and Jordan Officer.

He formed the McDades in 2000 with his sister Shannon Johnson and his brother, Jeremiah McDade. Their album Bloom (2007) was given the Juno Award for best roots/traditional album by a group. It also won an Independent Music Award and two Canadian Folk Music Awards. In 2018 he released his debut album "Murals".

Discography
As Leader
 Murals 

With The McDades
 Bloom 
 For Reel

With Terry McDade
 Harpe Danse
 Midwinter
 Noel

With Maria Dunn
 For a Song
 We Were Good People
 From Where I Stand
 The Peddler
 Gathering

With others
 Susie Arioli, Pennies from Heaven featuring Ralph Sutton
 Bill Bourne, Farmer, Philanthropist and Musician
 Bourne & Johnson, Victory Train
 Bob Jahrig, Treetops
 Jon McCaslin, McCallum's Island
 David Wilkie with The McDades, Cowboy Celtic

References

External links
 Solon McDade's website
 The McDades website

1974 births
Living people
Canadian folk musicians
Canadian people of Irish descent
MacEwan University alumni
Musicians from Edmonton